Hairul Azreen Idris (born 23 April 1988) is a Malaysian Taekwondo athlete, martial artist, actor and stuntman. He is best known for starring in the action films PASKAL The Movie, Operasi X, and Polis EVO 2 (2018).

Early life
Hairul Azreen was born and raised in Kuala Lumpur, Malaysia, and is the son of Idris Ali and Habsah Desa. He is the last child of four siblings. Hairul began to practice Taekwondo, receiving his black belt as well as former athletes in 2004 Sukma Games event for Selangor contingents.

Personal life
On June 8, 2015, Hairul married actress, TV host and blogger Hanis Zalikha. The couple have two children, Yusuf Iskandar and Alisa Aisyah.

Filmography

Film

Television series

Telemovie

Music video

Awards and nominations

References

External links
 

1988 births
Action choreographers
Malaysian male film actors
Malaysian martial artists
Malaysian Muslims
Living people
People from Kuala Lumpur
Malaysian male taekwondo practitioners
Malaysian male actors
Malaysian male television actors